Smyrna Mills is an unincorporated village in the town of Smyrna, in Aroostook County, Maine, United States. Smyrna Mills has a post office with ZIP code 04780.

References

Villages in Aroostook County, Maine
Villages in Maine